Dewhurst v. Coulthard, 3 U.S. (3 Dall.) 409 (1799), was a United States Supreme Court case that initiated with a civil suit brought by Isaac Coulthard (owner of Coulthard's Brewery) against John Dewhurst which reached the Court by a convoluted process. The Court refused to hear the case: "This court will not take cognizance of any suit, or controversy not brought before them by regular process of law."

References

External links
 

United States Supreme Court cases
United States Supreme Court cases of the Ellsworth Court
1799 in United States case law